Adrian Kendal Dixon FRCR, FRCP, FRCS, FMedSci (born 1948) was the Master of Peterhouse, Cambridge. until 30 June 2016. He is now closely involved in the University of Cambridge administration, both at home and abroad.

Dixon was educated at Uppingham and the University of Cambridge. In 2014 he was awarded the gold medal of the European Society of Radiology.

Early life
Dixon was born in Cambridge, where he is now Emeritus Professor of Radiology at the University of Cambridge and Honorary Consultant Radiologist at Addenbrooke's Hospital. The son of a long-standing Fellow of King's College, Cambridge, Kendal Dixon, and the grandson of Henry Horatio Dixon, he was educated at Uppingham and King's College, Cambridge, where he studied medicine, graduating in 1969 before undertaking clinical medical studies at St Bartholomew's Hospital, London.

Career and Academia
Dixon pursued medicine in Nottingham, obtaining MRCP in 1974 (proceeding FRCP 1991), before specialising in radiology. After periods in paediatric radiology at Great Ormond Street Hospital and in computed tomography (CT) at St Bartholomew's Hospital, he became a lecturer at the University of Cambridge's Department of Radiology in 1979 and was elected as a Fellow of Peterhouse in 1986. In 1994 he became professor of radiology at the university, and remains Emeritus Professor and an Honorary Consultant Radiologist.  He was appointed editor-in-chief of European Radiology in 2007, completing a 6-year term in 2013.

Master of Peterhouse, Cambridge
He was elected Master of Peterhouse, Cambridge from 2008, stepping down from the position on 30 June 2016. He remains active within the University of Cambridge administration and is still closely involved with Peterhouse. Dixon is a Fellow of the Royal College of Radiologists (FRCR), the Royal College of Physicians (FRCP), the Royal College of Surgeons (FRCS) and the Academy of Medical Sciences (FMedSci).  In 2014 he was awarded the gold medal of the European Society of Radiology.

References

External links
 Debrett's People of Today
 Peterhouse website

1948 births
Living people
People educated at Uppingham School
Alumni of King's College, Cambridge
Fellows of the Royal College of Physicians
Fellows of the Royal College of Surgeons
Fellows of the Academy of Medical Sciences (United Kingdom)
Fellows of the Royal College of Radiologists
Fellows of Peterhouse, Cambridge
Masters of Peterhouse, Cambridge